Gruntal & Co. was a boutique investment banking and brokerage firm based in New York City.  Prior to its acquisition in 2002, the firm was among the oldest independent investment banking houses in the U.S. The firm was founded as Sternberger & Fuld in 1880 by Maurice Sternberger, who partnered with Ludwig Fuld. Sternberger bought a seat on the New York Stock Exchange in 1881 for $20,000. They were joined in 1884 by a third partner, Samuel Sinn, and the firm became Sternberger, Fuld & Sinn, with an office at 52 Broadway in lower Manhattan.

Gruntal's brokerage business included more than 620 account executives across more than 30 locations throughout the U.S.  The firm managed in excess of $19 billion of assets on behalf of its clients through its private client wealth management business.  Additionally, the firm had a well-regarded investment banking, equity research as well as sales and trading operations.

Gruntal, which was headquartered in New York City was a member of the New York Stock Exchange and the National Association of Securities Dealers.

In 2002, Ryan Beck, a New Jersey-based investment banking firm, announced the acquisition of the bulk of the operations Gruntal.  Following the acquisition, the Gruntal name which had been used since the early 1900s was retired.  The firm, which had already been struggling to compete with the bulge bracket investment banks suffered the temporary loss of its headquarters after the September 11 attacks.  The firm was located at 1 Liberty Plaza, across the street from the World Trade Center. Gruntal had already been eliminating certain businesses, including its corporate bond trading department in July 2001.  In 2007, Ryan Beck & Co. was sold to Stifel Financial.

Corporate affairs

Prominent former employees
Steven A. Cohen founder of hedge funds S.A.C. Capital Advisors and Point72 Asset Management

Stephen A. Feinberg Co-Founder and Co-Chief Executive Officer, Cerberus Capital Management

References

Further reading
Gruntal & Co. Company History.  Funding Universe
Gruntal's Herzfeld Tie Unites Venerable Firms. New York Times, September 10, 1985
Financial Concern Might Buy Gruntal. New York Times, June 25, 1987
Home Group Adding Gruntal. New York Times, June 26, 1987
Gruntal Buying Moseley Unit. New York Times, November 10, 1987
Long Island Q&A: Howard Silverman; A Financial Business Casts a Vote of Confidence for the Island. New York Times, July 10, 1994
Gruntal Agrees To Fraud Fine As U.S. Indicts Former Official.  New York Times, April 10, 1996
Gruntal Executives to Lead Leveraged Buyout of Firm. New York Times, February 26, 1997

Former investment banks of the United States
Financial services companies established in 1880
Financial services companies disestablished in 2002
Companies based in New York City
Defunct financial services companies of the United States
Banks established in 1880
Banks disestablished in 2002
1880 establishments in New York (state)
2002 mergers and acquisitions